Mount Beenak is a mountain in Victoria, Australia 65 km from Melbourne.

The summit is 745m and is most easily accessed by following a fire access vehicle track from the Mount Beenak Road.

There are good views across to the Yarra Valley, the Latrobe Valley and Central Highlands mountain ranges.

Extensive logging of the summit region left it bare of forest in July 2013.

See also

List of mountains in Victoria

References 

Beenak

Forests of Victoria (Australia)